Abu Al-Asar Hafeez Jalandhari (born 14 January 1900 – 21 December 1982) was a Pakistani Urdu-language poet who wrote the lyrics for the National Anthem of Pakistan and National Anthem of Azad Kashmir.

Early life
Chaudhary Abu Alasr Hafeez Jalandhari was born  in Jalandhar, Punjab, British India on 14 January 1900 in Chohan Family. His father, Shams-ud-Din, was a Hafiz-e-Qur'an. Jalandhari initially studied in a mosque school and later joined a local school. He only received formal education until the seventh grade. He had a natural liking for poetry. He became the disciple of Maulana Qadir Gharami.

After the independence of Pakistan in 1947, Jalandhari migrated to Lahore in the new state of Pakistan.

Literary career
From 1922 to 1929, Jalandhari remained the editor of a few monthly magazines namely, Nonehal, Hazar Dastaan, Teehzeeb-e-Niswan, and Makhzin. His first collection of poems Nagma-e-Zar was published in 1935. After World War II, he worked as the director of the Song Publicity Department. During this same time he wrote several songs.

Jalandhari participated in the Pakistan Movement and used his writings to inspire people for the cause of Pakistan. In early 1948, he joined the forces for the freedom of Kashmir and got wounded. Jalandhari wrote the Kashmiri Anthem, "Watan Hamara Azad Kashmir". He wrote many patriotic songs during the Indo-Pakistani War of 1965.

Jalandhari served as Director General of morals in Pakistan Armed Forces, and then in a very prominent position as an adviser to the President, Field Marshal Mohammad Ayub Khan and also a Director of Writers Guild of Pakistan.

Jalandhari's work of poetry, Shahnam-e-Islam, gave him incredible fame which, in the manner of Firdowsi's Shahnameh, is a record of the glorious history of Islam in verse.

In 1946, Jalandhari visited the Sylhet region of Bengal where he watched a mushaira performance by the Anjuman-i Taraqqi-i Urdu.

On 23 February 1949, Government of Pakistan formed a committee to prepare Pakistan's national anthem. 723 people competed to write the national anthem. Out of which, Hafeez Jalandhari's lyrics were selected as the national anthem of Pakistan. Then this national anthem of Pakistan was composed by Ahmed Ghulamali Chagla also known as Ahmed G Chagla. Hafeez Jalandhari was unique in Urdu poetry for the enchanting melody of his voice and lilting rhythms of his songs and lyrics. His poetry generally dealt with romantic, religious, patriotic and natural themes. His language was a fine blend of Hindi and Urdu diction, reflecting the composite culture of South Asia. One of his most famous poem 'Abhi Toh Mein Jawan Hoon' was sung by Malika Pukhraj in the 1950s with music by the Pakistani music director Master Inayat Hussain which is still popular among the public in 2018. Though considered a devout Muslim, he also wrote Krishn Kanhaiya, a poem in praise of the Hindu god Krishna.

Marriage
Jalandhari married his cousin, Zeenat Begum, in 1917, at the age of 17. They had seven children, all girls. In 1939, he took a young English woman of Lithuanian descent, Anela, as his second wife. They had a daughter; the marriage ended in divorce. His first wife, Zeenat Begum, died in 1954. In 1955, Jalandhari married Khurshid Begum, with whom he had a daughter.

Books
 Naghma Zar (1925)
 Shahnama-i-Islam (1928 - 1947) in four volumes
 Soz-o-Saaz (1932)
 Talkhaba-i-Shireen (1947)
 Chiragh-i-Sehar (1974)

Death
Jalandhari died in Lahore, Pakistan, on 21 December 1982 at the age of 82. Buried in Model Town, Lahore, his remains were later shifted to a tomb built by the Government of Pakistan near the Minar-e-Pakistan in Lahore, the site of the Pakistan Resolution.

Awards and recognition
For his literary and patriotic services to Pakistan, Jalandhari was awarded the Hilal-i-Imtiaz Award by the President of Pakistan.
 Pride of Performance Award in 1958 by the Government of Pakistan.

Commemorative postage stamp
In 2001, Pakistan Post Office issued a commemorative postage stamp in his honor in its 'Poets of Pakistan' series.

See also
 List of people on stamps of Pakistan
 Qaumi Tarana

References

1900 births
1982 deaths
People from Jalandhar
Punjabi people
Pakistani poets
Urdu-language poets from Pakistan
National anthem writers
Recipients of the Pride of Performance
Recipients of Hilal-i-Imtiaz
Pakistani hymnwriters
People from British India
Writers from Lahore
Poets from Lahore
20th-century poets
Pakistan Movement activists